Bloomfield is a community in the Canadian province of New Brunswick. It is located in Carleton County.

Unincorporated area in the Parish of Wilmot.  Located about 20 kilometers from Woodstock and about the same from the Centreville area. It is pretty much the way it's always been a small farming community and it is predominantly potatoes with some mixed farming and only one larger dairy farm.

Religion

The church in Bloomfield is the United Church of Canada and the cemetery located right there (in Route 550 and the Monticello, Maine Road) is called the Bloomfield United Church Cemetery.

History

Notable people

See also
List of communities in New Brunswick

References

Communities in Carleton County, New Brunswick